Paul Tse Wai-chun, JP (born 1959) is a Hong Kong solicitor, who claims himself as the "Superman of Law". He also owns a small travel agency and was elected to the Legislative Council of Hong Kong for the tourism functional constituency in the 2008 legislative election. He is known for his relationship with celebrity and radio host Pamela Peck. Tse is of Hakka ancestry.

Career
Tse practised law as a barrister in Australia for seven years after graduating from University of New South Wales.

Tse then finished his pupillage in Hong Kong under Justice Peter Nguyen. Tse was called to the bar in 1992 and set up his own firm in 1997.

His media stunts and quest for self-publicity have caused controversy. From 1997 to 1999, Paul posed in his underpants only for magazines to spread the message that "laws are inherent to every people". After disciplinary hearings which lasted for nearly a decade, the Law Society of Hong Kong suspended his solicitor's license for 12 months for this stunt, but his firm could continue because there were other partners.

In 2010, Tse was the sole legislator to vote against the introduction of a minimum wage in Hong Kong.

In February 2021, Tse said that Sinopharm vaccines should be administered in Hong Kong, despite the fact that the trial data has not been released.

Also in February 2021, Tse announced potential reductions of power held by Legislative Council members, claiming that the reductions would create a "balance between the effective operation of the council and the right of speech of legislators." In response, Andrew Wan said that such changes would serve only to minimize any antigovernmental opposition within the legislature. Tse also said that lawmakers could be banned for a week if they violated any of the new rules, and that the new rules could take effect as soon as 24 March 2021.

In April 2021, Tse said that people who urge others to cast blank ballots may commit the crime of "inciting subversion" under the National Security Law.

In January 2022, Tse said that he would try to introduce legislation to block the "yellow economic circle", where pro-democracy supporters boycott shopping at pro-government businesses.

Personal life
Tse was born in Shap Pat Heung, Yuen Long, New Territories, Hong Kong, into a working-class family. His family lives in New Jersey, United States.

Property 
Out of all 90 legislative council members in the 2022-2025 term, Tse owned the most properties, with 15 residential units in Hong Kong and 1 in Beijing.

References

External links

Paul Tse Solicitor Firm
Official site of Paul Tse

1959 births
Alumni of the City University of Hong Kong
HK LegCo Members 2008–2012
HK LegCo Members 2012–2016
HK LegCo Members 2016–2021
HK LegCo Members 2022–2025
Members of the Election Committee of Hong Kong, 2021–2026
Hong Kong pro-Beijing politicians
Hong Kong television presenters
Indigenous inhabitants of the New Territories in Hong Kong
Living people
Solicitors of Hong Kong
University of New South Wales alumni
Hong Kong people of Hakka descent
District councillors of Wan Chai District